The Clarendon Centre (or Clarendon Shopping Centre) is a shopping centre in central Oxford, England, opened in 1984. The centre faces Cornmarket Street, and has other entrances onto Queen Street and Shoe Lane.  The fascia onto Cornmarket Street is that of the Woolworths store which had, in a decision later criticised, replaced the Georgian Clarendon Hotel; it was discovered during demolition that medieval construction had been present within the hotel.  The shopping centre was expanded in 2012–14. Major tenants include TK Maxx, H&M and Gap Outlet.

Location 
The centre is in central Oxford,   located to the west of Cornmarket Street and to the north of Queen Street. It is accessible from both of these streets and is L-shaped. There is also an entrance on Shoe Lane, off New Inn Hall Street.  On the opposite side of Cornmarket is the more historic Golden Cross shopping arcade, located in the medieval courtyard of one of the coaching inns of Oxford, leading to the Covered Market. At the western end of Queen Street is the Westgate Shopping Centre, which was extensively redeveloped and extended in 2017.

History

Site history 

Formerly on this site was the Clarendon Hotel on Cornmarket Street, which grew from two former coaching inns, the King's Head and the Star.  The hotel was a Georgian building, though beneath it was a vaulted wine cellar, which was the oldest in Oxford.  The hotel closed in 1939; Woolworths purchased it in that year; it was used as an American Servicemen's Club, and then as offices, before being demolished in 1954. The demolition was later criticised, although a report by Thomas Sharp in 1948 had recommended the building should be retained.

The area was the site of an early archaeological study in the 1950s. Architectural excavations, by W. A. Pantin and E. M. Jope, took place during and after the demolition.   During these, it was discovered that the wine cellar dated back to the twelfth century, and the "complete framework of a sixteenth century timber-framed house" was behind the fascia, among other architectural discoveries.  Pantin made the argument that, had this been known before demolition, the building could have been saved:

The dig also revealed wares dating back to Saxon Britain, including eleventh-century pottery and a thirteenth-century aquamanile.

The new Woolworths branch was designed by Sir William Holford, who sought to build a "Woolworths worthy of Oxford" after previous designs were rejected; Holford's design was also rejected by Oxford City Council, but the decision was overturned by Harold Macmillan, who was the Minister of Housing and Local Government at the time. The store was ceremonially opened on 18 October 1957 by the Mayor and Mayoress of Oxford; the former complimented the building.  The branch was five times larger than its predecessor—indeed, when it opened, it was the biggest in Europe—and contained a deluxe cafeteria, offices, a roof garden and a multi-storey car park. While the store was open, the ceremony of "beating the bounds" of the parish of St Michael at the North Gate required the participants to pass through the store.   The store closed in 1983.

Development as a shopping centre 
The Clarendon Centre was built on the site in 1983–84, designed by Gordon Benoy and Partners, and built by property company Arrowcroft.  The centre was financed by the pension fund of the National Westminster Bank.  It initially had  of retail space, with Littlewoods as a  anchor store.  There were more than 20 other shops, with shops signed up prior to construction including Dolcis, Etam, Chelsea Girl and Dixons.  The centre was developed in two phases, with the first being the section connecting Cornmarket Street to Shoe Lane.

The frontage of the old building on Cornmarket Street was retained, including the ornate "W" mark above a door.  For the frontage onto Queen Street, the former Halfords shop was demolished; Halfords would later open within the centre, in a unit facing Shoe Lane.  In January 1984, one person was killed and another seriously injured when a collapse occurred at the Queen Street demolition site for the centre.

The centre was completed in 1984, being already fully let in October of that year, before it was completed. Writing in the "Oxford Diary" column in The Times in January 1984, A. N. Wilson labelled the newly built centre as "the most grotesquely horrible building I have ever seen"; in 1985, a reporter for The Observer described the centre's "phoney unfunctional pipes" and Bavarian marble floors.

In 1998, as the first step of a renovation of the centre, the Littlewoods store gave up  of space adjacent to Cornmarket Street, to create space for a new store; this was later filled by Gap, after the landlord, Gartmore Group, wanting to make the centre more fashion-focused, rejected a larger bid from the electronics retailer Comet.  Following the £5m renovation (which also involved new lighting and doors, and redecoration), the centre (now described as having  of retail space) was sold to an investment partnership in July 2000, for £80m.  H Samuel and French Connection were other new stores following the renovation.

The centre's layout was slightly modified in 2001, when the former Etam and Halfords units were merged to accommodate a relocated and enlarged Dixons store.  Then, on Saturday 7 August 2004, Littlewoods, the original anchor tenant, closed, notice of the closure having been given on the preceding Tuesday; contemporary reports suggested the closure was due to financial underperformance and another retailer's interest in the unit.  The unit was subsequently taken by Zara, on a fifteen-year lease.

2010s changes 

In 2012, a plan was put forward to extend the centre floorspace by 10%: replacing the section near Shoe Lane with a three-storey extension, to house H&M. Prior to construction of the extension, archaeologists carried out an excavation beneath the site to discover remains of occupation from the 17th century and earlier.  The new H&M store opened in 2014.

Following the reopening of Westgate Oxford in October 2017, the branch of Zara within the centre moved to the Westgate, vacating its unit in the Clarendon.  The site was taken over by TK Maxx, who opened their store on 30 May 2019, to queues of shoppers.  The conversion of the store retained the stone in a stockroom marking the boundary of the parish of St Michael at the North Gate, which is supposedly the oldest of the boundary stones; the ceremony to mark the boundary still passes through the centre.

Stores 
The centre has twenty-three stores and food outlets as of November 2019, including those intended to open in the near future. These included TK Maxx, H&M and Gap Outlet. In total, the centre has  of space.

References

External links 
 Clarendon Centre website

Commercial buildings completed in 1984
1984 establishments in England
Shopping malls established in 1984
Shopping centres in Oxford